WJJQ and WJJQ-FM are a pair of full-service radio stations in Tomahawk, Wisconsin.  They are owned by Albert Broadcasting, Inc. The company's FM service broadcasts a mixed adult contemporary and country music format, and the AM station airs a sports format and is a CBS Sports Radio affiliate.  The company is a family-owned community radio station.  Their slogan is: "Your information and entertainment station of the northwoods."  It is a 25,000 watt station that broadcasts at 92.5 MHz.  It uses the nickname "The Big Q.".  WJJQ (AM), previously used the call letters WYYS, and before that, WELF in the early 1970s.

External links
WJJQ official website

JJQ
Mainstream adult contemporary radio stations in the United States
Sports radio stations in the United States